Burg Perchtoldsdorf is a castle in Lower Austria, Austria.

See also
 List of castles in Austria

References 

This article was initially translated from the German Wikipedia.

Castles in Lower Austria
Mödling District